Hypervascularity is an increased number or concentration of blood vessels.

In Graves disease, the thyroid gland is hypervascular, which can help in differentiating the condition from thyroiditis.

90% of thyroid papillary carcinoma cases are hypervascular.

See also 
 Angiogenesis

References

Hematology
Oncology
Angiology